Chellampatti was a suburb and is now a neighbourhood of the city of Thanjavur in Thanjavur taluk, Thanjavur district, Tamil Nadu, India. It is located in the southwestern part of the city.

Governance
Chellampatti has been subsumed into the Thanjavur metropolitan area, and is under the Thanjavur City Corporation.

References

External links
 

Villages in Thanjavur district